Airbag dermatitis (also known as an "airbag burn") is skin irritation secondary to the deployment of airbags.

See also 
 Airbag
 Contact dermatitis
 List of cutaneous conditions

References 

Contact dermatitis
Airbags